The 1973 World Modern Pentathlon Championships were held in London, Great Britain.

Medal summary

Men's events

Medal table

See also
 World Modern Pentathlon Championship

References

 Sport123

Modern pentathlon in the United Kingdom
World Modern Pentathlon Championships, 1973
World Modern Pentathlon Championships, 1973
World Modern Pentathlon Championships, 1973
International sports competitions in London
Multisports in the United Kingdom